Engine House No. 31, in the Russian Hill neighborhood of San Francisco, California, was built in 1908.  It was listed on the National Register of Historic Places in 1988.
 
It is located at 1088 Green St. and is now a private residence.

It was operational as a fire station from 1908 to 1952.

References

Fire stations on the National Register of Historic Places in California
National Register of Historic Places in San Francisco
Tudor Revival architecture in the United States
Fire stations completed in 1908
1908 establishments in California